Lord of Dark Places is a novel by Hal Bennett. It deals with the events surrounding a black man from the American South who moves to the north. It has been described as "a satirical and all but scatological attack on the phallic myth", :

References

African-American novels
Novels set in Virginia
Novels set in New Jersey
1970 American novels
Novels by Hal Bennett
W. W. Norton & Company books